This is a list of James Madison Dukes football players in the NFL Draft.

Key

Selections

Notable undrafted players
Note: No drafts held before 1920

References

James Madison

James Madison Dukes NFL Draft